Munshi Nawal Kishore (3 January 1836 – 19 February 1895) was a book publisher from India. He has been called Caxton of India. In 1858, at the age of 22, he founded the Nawal Kishore Press at Lucknow. This institution today is the oldest printing and publishing concern in Asia. Mirza Ghalib was one of his admirers.

Biography 

Munshi Nawal Kishore was the second son of Munshi Jamuna Prasad Bhargava, a zamindar of Aligarh, and was born on 3 January 1836. At the age of six, he was admitted in a local school (maktab) to learn Arabic and Persian. At the age on 10, he was admitted in Agra College, but he never completed his education there for an unknown reason. During this time, he developed his interest in journalistic writing, and issued a short-lived weekly paper Safeer-e-Agra. He briefly served as an assistant editor and editor of Koh-i-Noor, a magazine of Koh-i-Noor Press owned by Munshi Harsukh Roy.

On 23 November 1858, he founded a printing press known as Munshi Nawal Kishor Press. From 1859, he started publishing weekly newspaper Avadh Akhbar, also known as Oudh Akhbar.

He died on 19 February 1895 in Delhi. His body was buried instead of traditional cremation. The Government of India issued a postage stamp on him in his honour in 1970.

Munshi Nawal Kishore published more than 5000 books in Arabic, Bengali, Hindi, English, Marathi, Punjabi, Pashto, Persian, Sanskrit and Urdu during 1858–1885. The Ram Kumar Press and Tej Kumar Press, started by his sons, are successors to the Nawal Kishore Press.

Munshi was a member of the Indian National Congress.

References

Further reading 
 
 

Indian book publishers (people)
1836 births
1885 deaths
People from Aligarh
19th-century Indian businesspeople
Businesspeople from Lucknow
Indian magazine founders